The Akha National Development Party (ANDP) is a minor political party in Myanmar (Burma). The party seeks to represent the Akha people of Shan State. As of the 2015 general election, it currently controls a single ethnic affairs ministry.

References

2015 establishments in Myanmar
Ethnic political parties
Political parties established in 2015
Political parties in Myanmar